Idionyx saffronatus, or Saffron Shadow Dancer is a species of dragonfly in the family Synthemistidae. It is known only from the Western Ghats of India.

Description and habitat
It is a small dragonfly with emerald-green eyes. Its thorax is brilliant metallic green with a narrow medial oblique stripe on each side. The posterior half of the metepimeron is yellow. Beneath the side is striped black and yellow. Abdomen is black. The first and second segments marked narrowly along the ventral borders with citron-yellow. Segments 7 to 10 are bordered with bright yellow. Segment 10 strongly keeled but without a dorsal spine. Anal appendages are black.

Fraser (1936) states that the species occurs of altitudes of 3,000 ft and more. Nothing else is known about the habitat or ecology of this species.

See also
 List of odonates of India
 List of odonata of Kerala

References

Synthemistidae
Taxa named by Frederic Charles Fraser